The 2019 Gauteng provincial election was held on 8 May 2019, concurrently with the 2019 South African general election, to elect the 73 members of the Gauteng Provincial Legislature.

Incumbent Premier David Makhura led the ruling African National Congress (ANC), with the party attempting to retain its majority status and secure Makhura a second full term in office as premier. The media and political analysts widely expected that the ANC would lose its majority in the Gauteng Provincial Legislature, therefore it was considered to be the most hotly-contested province in this election cycle.

The Official Opposition Democratic Alliance (DA) nominated Mayor of Tshwane Solly Msimanga to be its premier candidate. Msimanga was elected Tshwane Mayor in the aftermath of the 2016 South African municipal elections as the ANC had lost its majority in the Tshwane City Council. The DA did also manage to gain control of the City of Johannesburg and Mogale City.

The Economic Freedom Fighters (EFF), which won 8 seats and clinched the title of the third largest party in 2014, was expected to grow in this election, possibly holding the balance of power, if the ANC had lost its majority.

The fourth largest party in the provincial legislature, the Freedom Front Plus (FF+), saw Gauteng as a province of significant importance for its election campaign. The party nominated Member of Parliament and advocate Anton Alberts as its premier candidate.

The provincial election was won by the ruling ANC, but with a reduced seat total of only 37 seats, the threshold for a majority. The DA underperformed and lost support in this election, losing a total of three seats, which only gave the party 20 seats in the provincial legislature. The EFF grew its support and won three additional seats. The FF+ gained two seats, while the Inkatha Freedom Party (IFP) retained its sole seat. The African Christian Democratic Party (ACDP) returned to the provincial legislature by winning one seat.

Results

References

2019 elections in South Africa
Western Cape provincial election